The national flag of the Principality of Liechtenstein consists of two horizontal bands, one blue and one red, charged with a gold crown in the canton. In use since 1764 and officially enshrined into the nation's constitution in 1921, it has been the flag of the principality since that year. The crown was added to the flag in 1937 after the country found out at the Summer Olympics held the previous year that their flag was identical to the civil flag of Haiti.

History

Liechtenstein was formed in 1719 as a principality within the Holy Roman Empire and gained complete independence in 1866. Within this period, the colours blue and red were selected to feature on the flag, instead of the gold and red on the coat of arms that would have customarily been employed instead. These new livery colours were first utilized by Prince Joseph Wenzel I in 1764.

A new constitution for the Principality was formulated and proclaimed in October 1921.  It made the blue and red banner the national flag by granting it "official status". Fifteen years later, during the 1936 Summer Olympics, the country came to the realization that its flag was identical to the flag of Haiti (Haiti took part in the Opening Ceremony but its sole athlete did not compete). Because of this finding, the government added the prince's crown to the canton. This change served two purposes – to signify Liechtenstein's position as a principality, and to distinguish its flag from Haiti's. This modified design was adopted on 24 June 1937.

Design

Construction

Symbolism
The colours and symbols of the flag carry cultural, political, and regional meanings. The blue represents the sky, while red alludes to the "evening fires" that are lit inside houses throughout the country. The crown is gold or yellow in colour.

Color scheme

Other flags of Liechtenstein

Government flags

Municipal flags
Each of the eleven municipalities has its own flag.

Historical flags

References

External links

 
 Original Law text 

National flags
Flag
Flags introduced in 1937